Gilbert Wilkinson Dawson (9 December 1914 – 24 May 1969) was an English cricketer. Dawson was a right-handed batsman.

Dawson spent his early years in the game playing for East Bierley, Windhill and Pudsey St. Lawrence.

Dawson made his first-class debut for Hampshire in the 1947 County Championship against Middlesex. In the same season Dawson scored his maiden first-class century against Yorkshire at Dean Park in Bournemouth. Dawson played twelve matches in 1947, scoring 382 at an average of 22.47, with a high score of 124. Dawson made one century and one half century.

The 1948 season was Dawson played thirty matches, where he scored another century against Derbyshire. In total Dawson scored 1,229 at an average of 23.63. Dawson additionally scored five more half centuries and took 23 catches. During this season Dawson was awarded his Hampshire cap.

Statistically the 1949 season was Dawson's most successful with the club. Dawson scored 1,032 at an average of 33.29, with a high score of 158* against Nottinghamshire, with two centuries and four half centuries. Dawson was statistically second among Hampshire's players that year. Dawson's final first-class match came in the same season against Essex.

In sixty first-class matches for Hampshire, Dawson scored 2,643 runs at an average of 26.43, high scoring with 158*, making four centuries and ten half centuries, as well as taking 36 catches.

After his first-class career, Dawson moved to Scotland, where he became associated with club cricket. After umpiring in a club game, during which he was taken ill. Dawson was later found dead in his crashed car on 24 May 1969 in Paisley, Glasgow, Lanarkshire.

References

External links
Gilbert Dawson at Cricinfo

1914 births
1969 deaths
Cricketers from Bradford
English cricketers
Hampshire cricketers
Road incident deaths in Scotland
English cricketers of 1946 to 1968